24 Minuti was an Italian free daily newspaper, published by Il Sole 24 Ore in collaboration with Il Sole 24 Ore Radiocor, in the cities of Rome and Milan in Italy.

Launched in 2006, it was the first Italian free daily newspaper devoted to an upper class readership. The owners decided to cease publication on 1 April 2009, due to low advertising revenue caused by the 2009 economic crisis.

References

External links 
  

Defunct free daily newspapers
Italian-language newspapers
Publications established in 2006
Publications disestablished in 2009
Defunct newspapers published in Italy
Newspapers published in Milan
Newspapers published in Rome
2006 establishments in Italy
2009 disestablishments in Italy
Daily newspapers published in Italy